Sven Owe Ohlsson (born 19 August 1938) is a Swedish former football player who played as a forward and later became a manager. He most notably represented IFK Göteborg and AIK at the club level. He won 15 caps for the Sweden national team and was a squad member at the 1958 FIFA World Cup.

Club career 
Born in Hälsö, he played for local club Hälsö BK before moving to Swedish giants IFK Göteborg and AIK. He ended his career as player-coach of IFK Stockholm. He is the first player to score five goals in a European Cup match, in the 1959–60 European Cup, against Linfield. He won the 1957–58 Allsvenskan title while at IFK Göteborg.

International career 
He was part of the Swedish squad at the 1958 FIFA World Cup. He was capped 15 times, scoring 6 goals. He also represented the Sweden U21 and B teams.

Career statistics

International 

Scores and results list Sweden's goal tally first, score column indicates score after each Ohlsson goal.

Honours 
IFK Göteborg

 Allsvenskan: 1957–58
Sweden

 FIFA World Cup runner-up: 1958

References

1938 births
Living people
Swedish footballers
Sweden international footballers
IFK Göteborg players
AIK Fotboll players
1958 FIFA World Cup players
Swedish football managers
Association football forwards